Kalina Petrova Balabanova (Bulgarian: Калина Петрова Балабанова), (born 10 February 1990) in Sofia, is a Bulgarian politician who is a member of the nationalist party Attack.

She is currently a deputy in the National Parliament and is also part of the youth wing of the party.

In addition to her political career, Balabanova has been educated as an engineer with a specialty in "computer systems and technologies". She is (as of 2014) pursuing a Master's at the Technical University of Sofia.
Besides her native Bulgarian, she speaks English, German and Russian.

References

1990 births
Living people
Politicians from Sofia
Bulgarian nationalists
21st-century Bulgarian women politicians
21st-century Bulgarian politicians
Attack (political party) politicians
Members of the National Assembly (Bulgaria)